The United States Department of Defense acknowledges holding  Tunisian detainees in Guantanamo.
A total of 779 detainees have been held in extrajudicial detention in the Guantanamo Bay detention camps, in Cuba since the camps opened on January 11, 2002
The camp population peaked in 2004 at approximately 660.  Only nineteen new detainees, all "high value detainees" have been transferred there since the United States Supreme Court's ruling in Rasul v. Bush.   
By July 2012 the camp held 168 captives.

On February 24, 2010, Carol Rosenberg, of the Miami Herald, reported that Albania accepted the transfer of three former detainees, a Tunisian, Saleh Bin Hadi Asasi and Sharif Fati Ali al Mishad and Rauf Omar Mohammad Abu al Qusin, an Egyptian, and a Libyan.
The men will not be allowed to leave Albania.

On July 27, 2012, Tunisia Live asserted the five remaining Tunisian captives would be repatriated by the end of 2012.

Tunisian detainees in Guantanamo

References

External links
 Guantánamo: A Tale of Two Tunisians Andy Worthington